Suning Universal Co., Ltd. is a Chinese real estate company. The company was owned by Zhang Guiping (via Suning Universal Group, Co. Ltd. for 21.750% stake, (Zhang himself had 90% stake in the Group Co.), as well as held 17.270% stake directly. Zhang Kangli, son of Zhang Guiping, owned 14.930% stake in the listed company, as well as 10% in the Group Company, making the listed company was majority owned by Zhang family. Zhang Guiping is the elder brother of Zhang Jindong, co-founder of Suning Commerce Group.

, it is one of the 200 components of SZSE 200 Index (the mid cap index of 101st to 300th companies).

In order to list in Shenzhen Stock Exchange, Suning Universal Group purchased a listed company and paper maker based in Jilin Province, and then inject the business from Suning Universal Group to the listed subsidiary.

References

External links
  

Real estate companies of China
Companies listed on the Shenzhen Stock Exchange